Europolis may refer to:

 Irisbus Europolis, a midibus model
 Europolis, a 1933 book by Romanian writer Eugeniu Botez
 A level in the 2016 video game Dreamfall Chapters

See also
 Europolitics, a European affairs daily newspaper and website